Bhagu was a Bhakti movement poet. She belonged to the Mahar caste. Little is known about her. In the Shrisakalsantgatha she is called "Bhagu Maharin".

References

Bhakti movement
Marathi-language poets
Marathi-language literature
Dalit literature
Dalit saints
Dalit Hindu saints